The following is an alphabetical list of topics related to the nation of Kalaallit Nunaat (Greenland).

0–9

.gl – Internet country code top-level domain for Greenland

A
Administrative divisions of Greenland
Air Force of Greenland
Air Greenland
Airports in Greenland
Americas
North America
Northern America
Islands of Greenland
Arctic Ocean
Baffin Bay
Davis Strait
Kane Basin
Labrador Sea
North Atlantic Ocean
Denmark Strait
Greenland Sea
Arctic and North Temperate Zone
Arctic Ocean
Atlantic Ocean
Atlas of Greenland (Kalaallit Nunaat)
Augusta Salling

B
Baffin Bay
Birds of Greenland

C
Capital of Greenland:  Nuuk
Categories:
:Category:Greenland
:Category:Buildings and structures in Greenland
:Category:Communications in Greenland
:Category:Economy of Greenland
:Category:Education in Greenland

:Category:Environment of Greenland
:Category:Geography of Greenland
:Category:Government of Greenland
:Category:Greenland stubs
:Category:Greenlandic culture
:Category:Greenlandic people
:Category:Greenland-related lists
:Category:History of Greenland
:Category:Military of Greenland
:Category:Municipalities of Greenland
:Category:Politics of Greenland
:Category:Society of Greenland
:Category:Sport in Greenland
:Category:Transport in Greenland
commons:Category:Greenland
Cities in Greenland
Climate of Greenland
Coat of arms of Greenland
Communications in Greenland
Constitution of Greenland
Cuisine of Greenland
Culture of Greenland

D
Danish colonization of the Americas
Davis Strait
Demographics of Greenland
Denmark
Denmark Strait

E
Economy of Greenland
Education in Greenland
Elections in Greenland
Extreme points of Greenland

F

Flag of Greenland
Flora of Greenland
Football in Greenland
Foreign relations of Greenland

G
Geography of Greenland
Geology of Greenland
Glaciers of Greenland
Government of Greenland
Governors of Greenland
Greenland (Kalaallit Nunaat, literally "Land of the Greenlanders")
Greenland Plate
Greenland Sea
Greenlander, citizen of Greenland
Greenlandic (disambiguation), adjective for Greenland
Greenlandic language
Gunnbjørn Fjeld – Highest point in Greenland and the entire Arctic

H
Health care in Greenland
Highest major mountain peaks of Greenland
History of Greenland

I
Inspectors of Greenland
International Organization for Standardization (ISO)
ISO 3166-1 alpha-2 country code for Greenland: GL
ISO 3166-1 alpha-3 country code for Greenland: GRL
ISO 3166-2:GL region codes for Greenland
Internet in Greenland
Islands of Greenland

J

K
Kalaallisut
Kalaallit Nunaat (Greenland)
Kane Basin (waterway)
Kingdom of Denmark (Kongeriget Danmark)

L
Labrador Sea
Languages of Greenland
Law enforcement in Greenland
LGBT rights in Greenland
Lists related to Greenland:
List of airports in Greenland
List of birds of Greenland
List of cities in Greenland
List of countries by GDP (nominal)
List of Governors of Greenland
List of Greenland-related topics
List of Inspectors of Greenland
List of islands of Greenland
List of mountains in Greenland
List of national parks of Greenland
List of political parties in Greenland
List of postal codes in Greenland
List of prime ministers of Greenland
List of rivers of Greenland
List of the highest major mountain peaks of Greenland
List of the most isolated major mountain peaks of Greenland
List of the most prominent mountain peaks of Greenland
List of towns in Greenland
List of ultra prominent peaks of Greenland
List of World Heritage Sites in Greenland
Lists of mountain peaks of Greenland
Topic outline of Greenland

M
Military of Greenland
Mountain peaks of Greenland
List of the highest major mountain peaks of Greenland
List of the most isolated major mountain peaks of Greenland
List of the most prominent mountain peaks of Greenland
Municipalities of Greenland
Music of Greenland

N
National parks of Greenland
North America
North Atlantic Ocean
North Temperate Zone and  Arctic
Northern America
Northern Hemisphere
Nuuk – Capital of Greenland

O

P
Parliament of Greenland
Politics of Greenland
List of political parties in Greenland
Postal codes of Greenland
Prime Minister of Greenland
List of Prime Ministers of Greenland

Q

R
Rigsfællesskabet
Rivers of Greenland

S

T
Topic outline of Greenland
Tourism in Greenland
Towns of Greenland
Transportation in Greenland

U
Ultra prominent peaks of Greenland
University of Greenland

V

W
Western Hemisphere

Wikipedia:WikiProject Topic outline/Drafts/Topic outline of Greenland
World Heritage Sites in Greenland

X

Y

Z

See also

List of international rankings
Lists of country-related topics
Topic outline of geography
Topic outline of Greenland
Topic outline of North America

References

External links

 
Greenland